Gustavo Martin Emilio Hamer (born 24 June 1997) is a professional footballer who plays as a defensive midfielder for EFL Championship club Coventry City. Born in Brazil, he represents the Netherlands internationally.

After moving to the Netherlands as a child, Hamer began his career at Feyenoord where he progressed through the youth system. He made 2 appearances for the first team before being loaned out to FC Dordrecht for the 2017–18 season.

Club career

Feyenoord 
Born in Brazil, Hamer moved to the Netherlands while still a child. As a youth player he was rejected by ADO Den Haag before joining Feyenoord's youth academy. He progressed well at Feyenoord, and earned caps for both the Netherlands U18 and U20 sides. Hamer made his professional debut on 2 April 2017 in an Eredivisie match against Ajax, coming on as an 89th minute substitute in a 2–1 loss. Three days later, on 5 April 2017, he would make his second and what would prove to be last appearance for Feyenoord in an 8–0 win against Go Ahead Eagles.

Loan to Dordrecht 
On 7 August 2017 Eerste Divisie club FC Dordrecht announced the signing of Hamer on a one-year loan deal. He made 39 appearances in all competitions for Dordrecht as they missed out on promotion after qualifying for the playoffs.

PEC Zwolle 
After the conclusion of his loan at Dordrecht, Hamer joined PEC Zwolle from Feyenoord on 2 May 2018. He signed a three-year contract with the club. Hamer made his debut for Zwolle on the opening day of the season, playing 90 minutes in a 3–2 loss against SC Heerenveen. He would go on to make 23 appearances in 2018–19 as Zwolle finished 13th in the Eredivisie. On 11 August 2019 Hamer scored his first goal for the club, netting with a direct free-kick in a 3–1 loss to FC Utrecht. His second season with Zwolle was cut short after the Dutch FA cancelled the remainder of the 2019–20 season due to the COVID-19 pandemic. Hamer finished the season having made 25 appearances and scored 4 goals.

Coventry City 
On 3 July 2020, English club Coventry City completed the signing of Hamer for a fee exceeding £1m. He made his debut in a 1-0 EFL Cup victory against MK Dons on 5 September. In his fifth appearance for the club, a 3–1 loss against Bournemouth, he was shown a red card for violent conduct which resulted in a three match suspension. Hamer returned from suspension on 27 October against Middlesbrough and three days later scored his first goal in a 3–2 win over Reading.

International career
Hamer was born in Brazil, but adopted and raised in the Netherlands. He is a youth international for the Netherlands at the U20 level.

Career statistics

Honours
Feyenoord
 Eredivisie: 2016–17
 Johan Cruijff Shield: 2017

Individual
 Coventry City Player of the Year 2021–22

References

External links
 

1996 births
Living people
Dutch footballers
Netherlands youth international footballers
Association football midfielders
Brazilian footballers
Dutch people of Brazilian descent
Dutch adoptees
Eredivisie players
Coventry City F.C. players
Eerste Divisie players
Feyenoord players
FC Dordrecht players
PEC Zwolle players
English Football League players
Sportspeople from Santa Catarina (state)